"Snowbird" is a song by the Canadian lyricist Gene MacLellan. Though it has been recorded by many performers, it is best known through Anne Murray's 1969 recording, which—after appearing as an album track in mid-1969—was released as a single in mid-1970. It was a No. 2 hit on Canada's pop chart and went to No. 1 on both the Canadian adult contemporary and country charts. The song reached No. 8 on the U.S. pop singles chart, spent six weeks at No. 1 on the U.S. adult contemporary chart, and became a surprise Top 10 U.S. country hit as well. It was certified as a gold single by the RIAA, the first American Gold record ever awarded to a Canadian solo female artist. The song peaked at No. 23 on the UK Singles Chart. In 2003 it was an inaugural song inductee of the Canadian Songwriters Hall of Fame.

Anne Murray and Gene MacLellan had met while both were regulars on the CBC television series Singalong Jubilee and Murray recorded two of MacLellan's compositions, "Snowbird" and "Biding My Time", for her first major label album release, This Way Is My Way, in 1969. Murray would recall: "Gene told me he wrote ["Snowbird"] in twenty minutes while walking on a beach on Prince Edward Island."

"Snowbird" sold well over a million copies and was picked as 19th on the 50 Tracks: The Canadian Version list, a partially populist approach to defining the most influential songs by Canadians.

Chart performance

Weekly singles charts

Year-end charts

Notable versions
Gene MacLellan's own recording of "Snowbird" on his 1970 album Street Corner Preacher features an additional verse to the song's standard two verse format.
In 2007, Murray remade "Snowbird" for her Anne Murray Duets: Friends & Legends album; the song being rendered as a duet with Sarah Brightman.
1970: Liv Maessen (No. 13 in Australia) 
1971: Chet Atkins - album For the Good Times  winner of Grammy Award for Best Country Instrumental Performance

In popular culture
Murray performed the song on episode 4.15 of The Muppet Show, in which she kept getting interrupted by a badly punning dodo.
In the Family Guy episode "Chris Cross", Brian and Stewie spend the third act arguing about the meaning of the song. When they travel to Canada to meet Murray in an attempt to ascertain its true meaning, Stewie becomes upset when he learns she did not write the song and holds Murray hostage.
D-TV set the song to the Pluto short, "Cold Storage".

See also
 Snowbird (person)

References

External links
 Dennis Walks' reggae version of this song on Discogs
 

1970 singles
Songs written by Gene MacLellan
Anne Murray songs
Andy Williams songs
Juno Award for Single of the Year singles
Capitol Records singles
Canadian soft rock songs
Songs about birds
Song recordings produced by Brian Ahern (producer)
1969 songs